The López family of Iloílo is a wealthy and influential Filipino family of business magnates, media proprietors and philanthropists descended from Basílio López (c. 1800–c. 1875), who adopted the surname of his Spanish master, López, upon the latter's death. He married Sabina Jalandoni and the couple had sixteen children: Eulalia, Clara, Eulogia, Eugenio (1839–1906, "Kapitán Eugenio"), Gregoria, Estanislao, Marcelo, Claudio, Simón, Agripino, Francisco, Cipriana, Agripino, Eusebio, Ysidora, and María.

The most prominent family members were the brothers Eugenio "Eñíng" H. López (1901–1975) and Fernando "Nandíng" H. López (1904–1993), great-grandsons of Basílio López and grandsons of Kapitán Eugenio J. López. The brothers' business interests are now known as the López Group of Companies. It includes the media and entertainment conglomerate ABS-CBN Corporation, and power generation and distribution company First Philippine Holdings Corporation. Fernando also served twice as Vice President of the Philippines under Presidents Elpidio Quirino and Ferdinand Marcos.

Notable members
 Eugenio Jalandoni López
 Eugenio H. López 
 Fernando H. López
 Eugenio M. López Jr.
 Eugenio Gabriel L. López III
 Gina L. López
 Martin L. López
 Carlo L. Katigbak

References